Beöthy is a Hungarian surname. Notable people with this surname include:

István Beöthy (1897–1961), Hungarian-French sculptor and architect
 (1873–1931), Hungarian theater director and journalist
Ödön Beöthy (1796–1854), Hungarian deputy and orator
Pál Beőthy (1866–1921), Hungarian jurist, soldier, and politician
 (1819–1896), Hungarian poet, writer, judge, and jurist
Zsolt Beöthy (1848–1922), Hungarian literary historian, critic, and professor

Hungarian-language surnames